Iodine azide is an explosive inorganic compound, which in ordinary conditions is a yellow solid. Formally, it is an inter-pseudohalogen.

Preparation 
Iodine azide can be prepared from the reaction between silver azide and elemental iodine:

Since silver azide can only be handled safely while moist, but even small traces of water cause the iodine azide to decompose, this synthesis is done by suspending the silver azide in dichloromethane and adding a drying agent before reaction with the iodine. In this way, a pure solution of iodine azide results, which can then be carefully evaporated to form needle-shaped golden crystals.

This reaction was used in the original synthesis of iodine azide in 1900, where it was obtained as unstable solutions in ether and impure crystals contaminated by iodine.

Iodine azide can also be generated in situ by reacting iodine monochloride and sodium azide under conditions where it is not explosive.

Properties 
In the solid state, iodine azide exists as a one-dimensional polymeric structure, forming two polymorphs, both of which crystallize in an orthorhombic lattice with the space group Pbam. The gas phase exists as monomeric units.

Iodine azide exhibits both high reactivity and comparative stability, consequences of the polarity of the I–N bond. The  group introduced by substitution with iodine azide can frequently undergo subsequent reactions due to its high energy content.

The isolated compound is strongly shock- and friction-sensitive. Its explosivity has been characterized as follows:

These values lie significantly lower in comparison to classical explosives like TNT or RDX, and also to acetone peroxide. Dilute solutions (< 3%) of the compound in dichloromethane can be handled safely.

Uses 
Despite its explosive character, iodine azide has many practical uses in chemical synthesis. Similar to bromine azide, it can add across an alkene double bond via both ionic and radical mechanisms, giving anti stereoselectivity. Azirines can also be synthesized from the addition product by adding base to eliminate HI, giving a vinyl azide  which undergoes thermolysis to form an azirine. Further radical modes of reactivity include radical substitutions on weak C-H bonds to form α‐azido ethers, benzal acetals, and aldehydes, and the conversion of aldehydes to acyl azides.

External links 

 Raman spectrum of iodine azide

References 

 

Iodine compounds
Azido compounds
Explosive polymers
Inorganic polymers
Pseudohalogens